Karachi floods may refer to

 2020 Karachi floods
 2017 Karachi floods
 2009 Karachi floods